Steamer Tovarishch Stalin (Comrade Stalin) was a Soviet freighter of about 3,100 tonnes displacement, active in the Arctic during the 1930s.

In 1933 Tovarishch Stalin, under Captain Sergeyev, took part in the first Soviet convoy to the mouth of the Lena River along with the steamers Pravda and Volodarskiy. The convoy leader, Captain M. A. Sorokin, was on board Volodarskiy. This convoy was led by the icebreaker Krasin (Captain Ya. P. Legzdin). 

On the way back, severe ice conditions in the Vilkitsky Strait (between Severnaya Zemlya and Cape Chelyuskin), forced the three freighters to winter at Ostrov Samuila in the Komsomolskoy Pravdy Islands. A shore station was built and a full scientific programme maintained all winter by leader scientist Nikolay Urvantsev and his wife, Dr. Yelizaveta Ivanovna, the expedition's medical officer.

These ships were released in the following year by icebreaker Fyodor Litke after much effort to break a channel through the thick ice. Once freed, the freighters separated and Fyodor Litke escorted Tovarishch Stalin. Both headed west through the Vilkitsky Strait towards Arkhangelsk.

References
 

Arctic exploration vessels
Laptev Sea
Polar exploration by Russia and the Soviet Union
Ships of the Soviet Union